This is a list of episodes of the BBC Radio comedy The Navy Lark. Also listed are episodes of The TV Lark which replaced The Navy Lark with the same cast of characters, before being replaced itself by the fifth series of The Navy Lark. All episodes were written by Laurie Wyman, except for series 12-15 which were written by Laurie Wyman and George Evans, and produced by Alastair Scott-Johnson unless otherwise indicated.

These episodes originally did not have titles. Titles here are taken from the series box sets and the 60th Anniversary collection. Alternate titles from repeat listings are included when applicable.

, one episode is missing from the BBC archives: The TV Lark episode 9, "The Top Secret Rocket Trials".

Series overview

Episodes

Series 1 (1959)

Series 2 (1959–60)

Series 3 (1960–61)

Series 4 (1961–62)

Christmas special (1962)

The TV Lark (1963)
Released in The Navy Lark Collection: Series 5.

Series 5 (1963)

Series 6 (1963–64)

Series 7 (1965)

Christmas special (1965)

Series 8 (1966)

Series 9 (1967)

Series 10 (1968–69)

Series 11 (1969–70)

Series 12 (1971)

Series 13 (1972)

Series 14 (1973)

Series 15 (1975–76)

Silver Jubilee special (1977)

Reunion special (1992)

Retrospective specials

Left Hand Down a Bit
Broadcast 13 May 2006 on BBC Radio 7.

A selection of episodes over 3 hours presented by Leslie Phillips.

Episodes Featured: 
 "Operation Fag End" (January 1959)
 "The Hank of Heather" (April 1959)
 "The Lighthouse Lark" (January 1960) 
 "A Deliberate Bashing" (April 1963)
 "Mr. Phillips at Dartmouth" (October 1967) 
 "The Jubilee Navy Lark" (July 1977)

The Leslie Philips links were released on The Navy Lark Collection: Series 10.

The Reunion
Broadcast 31 August 2008 10:15 am on BBC Radio 4.

Sue MacGregor presents the series which reunites a group of people intimately involved in a moment of modern history. She brings together some of the original team behind The Navy Lark. Participants included June Whitfield, Leslie Phillips, George Evans, Heather Chasen and Tenniel Evans.

References

Lists of British radio series episodes